In Greek mythology, Busiris (Ancient Greek: Βούσιρις) was the name shared by two figures:

 Busiris, an Egyptian prince as one of the sons of King Aegyptus. He suffered the same fate as his other brothers, save Lynceus, when they were slain on their wedding night by their wives who obeyed the command of their father King Danaus of Libya. Busiris was the son of Aegyptus by Argyphia, a woman of royal blood and thus full brother of Lynceus, Proteus, Enceladus, Lycus and Daiphron. In some accounts, he could be a son of Aegyptus either by Eurryroe, daughter of the river-god Nilus, or Isaie, daughter of King Agenor of Tyre. Busiris married the Danaid Automate, daughter of Danaus and Europe. 
 Busiris, a king of Egypt, who used to sacrifice strangers and was killed by Heracles.

Notes

References 

 Apollodorus, The Library with an English Translation by Sir James George Frazer, F.B.A., F.R.S. in 2 Volumes, Cambridge, MA, Harvard University Press; London, William Heinemann Ltd. 1921. ISBN 0-674-99135-4. Online version at the Perseus Digital Library. Greek text available from the same website.
Tzetzes, John, Book of Histories, Book VII-VIII translated by Vasiliki Dogani from the original Greek of T. Kiessling's edition of 1826. Online version at theio.com
Princes in Greek mythology
Sons of Aegyptus